Vujanić is a Serbian surname, derived from the male given name Vujan. Notable people with the surname include:

Miloš Vujanić (born 1980), Serbian basketball player
Saša Vujanić (born 1979), Serbian canoeist

See also
Vujanović

Serbian surnames